Glyphipterix cyanochalca is a species of sedge moth in the genus Glyphipterix. It was described by Edward Meyrick in 1882. It is found in south-east Australia.

References

Moths described in 1882
Glyphipterigidae
Moths of Australia